Fabrício Neis (born 15 June 1990, in Porto Alegre) is a Brazilian tennis player.

Neis has a career high ATP singles ranking of 449 achieved on 13 May 2013. He also has a career high ATP doubles ranking of 96 achieved on 3 October 2016.

Challenger and Futures finals

Singles: 5 (2–3)

Doubles: 78 (46–32)

External links

1990 births
Living people
Brazilian male tennis players
Sportspeople from Porto Alegre
20th-century Brazilian people
21st-century Brazilian people